This article lists political parties in Morocco.

Morocco has had a multi-party system since independence in 1956 with numerous parties ranging in ideology from the far-left to Islamists. The Moroccan electoral system leads the political parties to seek coalition governments. However, the Prime Minister appointed by the King from the party that achieved a plurality in the parliamentary elections, and other four main cabinet ministers are appointed by the King of Morocco.

Since Morocco considers the disputed territory of Western Sahara to be its Southern Provinces, the political parties are also active in those annexed parts of the territory administered by Morocco.

Parties represented in parliament

Parties without parliamentary representation
Action Party (Parti de l'Action)
Annahj Addimocrati
Citizens' Forces (Forces Citoyennes, Alqiwa alwatania)	
Democratic and Social Movement (Mouvement Démocratique et Social, Alharaka addimoqratia wa ashabia)
Democratic Independence Party (Parti Démocratique et de l'Indépendance, Hizbo ashoura wa alistiqlal)
Democratic Way
Green Party for Development
Izigzawen
Moroccan Liberal Party (Parti Marocain Libéral, Alhizbo almaghribi allibirali)
Moroccan Union for Democracy
National Democratic Party (Parti National-Démocrate) - in electoral alliance in 2007 with the Covenant Party 
Party of Liberty and Social Justice (Parti de la Liberté et de la Justice Sociale)
Party of Renaissance and Virtue (Parti de la renaissance et de la vertu, Hizb en-nahda wal fadila), 2006 splinter from the Justice and Development Party
Party of Renewal and Equity	
Party of the Social Center
Reform and Development Party (Parti de la Réforme et du Développement, Hizbo alisslahi wa attanmia)
Renaissance Party (Parti Annahda)
Social Centre Party (Parti du Centre Social)

Defunct parties
Democratic Socialist Party (Parti Socialiste Démocratique)
Labour Party (Parti travailliste, Hizb al’amali), splinter from the Socialist Union of Popular Forces
National Union of Popular Forces
Socialist Party (Parti Socialiste), splinter from the National Congress Party	
Amazigh Moroccan Democratic Party (Parti Démocratique Morocain Amazigh, PDAM, judicially dissolved and recreated under the denomination Izigzawen)

Banned parties
Hizb ut-Tahrir
Ila al-Amam
Party of al-Badil al-Hadari (Parti de l'alternative civilisationnelle)

See also 
Politics of Morocco
List of political parties by country

References 

Morocco
 
P
Morocco
Political parties